Oleksandr Oleksandrovych Babych (born 15 February 1979) is a Ukrainian professional football manager and former player.

Playing career

Early years
Oleksandr Babych is a product of the Dnipro Dnipropetrovsk Youth system.

Hirnyk-Sport Komsomolsk and Kremin Kremenchuk
After playing for Dnipro-2 in 1997, he left to play for Hirnyk-Sport Komsomolsk and Kremin Kremenchuk during the 1997–98 season.

Dnipro Dnipropetrovsk
From 1998 to 2001, Babych stayed again with Dnipro Dnipropetrovsk. He spent most of his playing time with the reserve teams Dnipro-2 and Dnipro-3; he did, however, play in a few games for the senior team.

Polihraftekhnika Oleksandriya
He was transferred to Polihraftekhnika Oleksandriya for the 2001–02 season. Babych scored the only goal in the relegation play-off game against Polissya Zhytomyr that allowed the Oleksandriya team to stay in the top tier.

Anzhi Makhachkala
He was then spotted by the Russian Premier League side Anzhi Makhachkala and was transferred to the club in 2003, playing there until 2005.

Metalist Kharkiv
His next stop was Metalist Kharkiv. At Metalist, he soon became the vice-captain and played a vital role in the team's defence.

Chornomorets Odesa
In February 2009, he moved to Chornomorets Odesa, where he was chosen captain on 15 July 2010, prior to the start of the 2010–11 season. The subsequent two seasons of his career were, however, marred by injuries, and Babych had to retire as a player on 2 March 2012.

Managerial career
He immediately became the manager of the Chornomorets youth squad, though.

Personal life
Babych is currently married to Natalia and has a daughter named Violetta.

External links
 
 
 Official Website Profile

1979 births
Living people
People from Alchevsk
Ukrainian footballers
Association football defenders
Ukrainian expatriate footballers
FC Hirnyk-Sport Horishni Plavni players
FC Dnipro-2 Dnipropetrovsk players
FC Dnipro-3 Dnipropetrovsk players
FC Metalist Kharkiv players
FC Chornomorets Odesa players
FC Dnipro players
FC Anzhi Makhachkala players
FC Oleksandriya players
FC Kremin Kremenchuk players
Expatriate footballers in Russia
Ukrainian expatriate sportspeople in Russia
Ukrainian Premier League players
Ukrainian First League players
Ukrainian Second League players
Russian Premier League players
Russian First League players
Ukrainian football managers
FC Chornomorets Odesa managers
FC Mariupol managers
FC Kryvbas Kryvyi Rih managers
Ukrainian Premier League managers
Ukrainian First League managers
Sportspeople from Luhansk Oblast